Kingsdon may refer to:

 Kingsdon, Devon
 Kingsdon, Somerset

See also
Kingsdown (disambiguation)